Bahadurpur is a village, in the Jamuria CD block in the Asansol subdivision of the Paschim Bardhaman district in the state of West Bengal, India.

Geography

Location

Urbanisation
According to the 2011 census, 83.33% of the population of Asansol Sadar subdivision was urban and 16.67% was rural. In 2015, the municipal areas of Kulti, Raniganj and Jamuria were included within the jurisdiction of Asansol Municipal Corporation. Asansol Sadar subdivision has 26 (+1 partly) Census Towns.(partly presented in the map alongside; all places marked on the map are linked in the full-screen map).

Civic administration

CD block HQ
The headquarters of Jamuria CD block are located at Bahadurpur.

Demographics
According to the 2011 Census of India, Bahadurpur had a total population of 2,514 of which 1,318 (52%) were males and 1,196 (48%) were females. Population in the age range 0–6 years was 260. The total number of literate persons in Bahadurpur was 1,622 (71.96% of the population over 6 years).

*For language details see Jamuria (community development block)#Language and religion

Education
Bahadurpur High School is a co-educational higher secondary school.

Healthcare
Bahadurpur Rural Hospital, with 30 beds, is the major government medical facility in the Jamuria CD block. Akalpur Block Primary Health Centre functions at Akalpur with 10 beds. There are primary health centres at Churulia (with 6 beds), Sirishdanaga, PO Mandi (with 6 beds), Birkulti (with 2 beds) and Chinchuria (with 6 beds).

References

Villages in Paschim Bardhaman district